Mount Olive Township is a township in Morris County, New Jersey, United States.  As of the 2020 United States census, the township's population was 28,886, its highest decennial census count ever and an increase of 769 (+2.7%) from the 28,117 enumerated at the 2010 census, which in turn reflected an increase of 3,924 (+16.2%) from the 24,193 counted at the 2000 census. Mount Olive is situated in western Morris County, bordering both Sussex and Warren counties. It is located within the Raritan Valley region.

The Township of Mount Olive was formed by an act of the New Jersey Legislature on March 22, 1871, from portions of Roxbury Township. Netcong was formed from portions of the township on October 23, 1894. The township was named for Benjamin Olive, a colonial-era Lieutenant Governor of New Jersey who donated land for the site of churches constructed in the area.

Geography
According to the United States Census Bureau, the township had a total area of 31.24 square miles (80.92 km2), including 29.62 square miles (76.71 km2) of land and 1.63 square miles (4.21 km2) of water (5.21%).

Budd Lake (with a 2010 Census population of 8,968) is an unincorporated community and census-designated place (CDP) located within Mount Olive Township.

Other unincorporated communities, localities and place names located partially or completely within the township include Bartley, Flanders, Saxton Falls, and Waterloo.

The township borders the municipalities of Chester Township, Netcong, Roxbury Township, and Washington Township in Morris County; Stanhope in Sussex County; and Hackettstown in Warren County.

Demographics

Census 2010

The Census Bureau's 2006–2010 American Community Survey showed that (in 2010 inflation-adjusted dollars) median household income was $77,243 (with a margin of error of +/− $5,287) and the median family income was $102,448 (+/− $8,454). Males had a median income of $70,532 (+/− $5,545) versus $52,205 (+/− $4,050) for females. The per capita income for the borough was $37,758 (+/− $1,723). About 3.8% of families and 5.8% of the population were below the poverty line, including 6.7% of those under age 18 and 6.1% of those age 65 or over.

Census 2000
As of the 2000 United States Census there were 24,193 people, 9,068 households, and 6,374 families residing in the township.  The population density was 797.0 people per square mile (307.8/km2).  There were 9,311 housing units at an average density of 306.7 per square mile (118.5/km2).  The racial makeup of the township was 86.69% White, 3.79% African American, 0.17% Native American, 6.00% Asian, 0.01% Pacific Islander, 1.53% from other races, and 1.81% from two or more races. Hispanic or Latino of any race were 5.97% of the population.

There were 9,068 households, out of which 39.0% had children under the age of 18 living with them, 59.6% were married couples living together, 7.4% had a female householder with no husband present, and 29.7% were non-families. 23.7% of all households were made up of individuals, and 5.1% had someone living alone who was 65 years of age or older.  The average household size was 2.66 and the average family size was 3.22.

In the township the population was spread out, with 27.6% under the age of 18, 6.8% from 18 to 24, 37.6% from 25 to 44, 21.7% from 45 to 64, and 6.4% who were 65 years of age or older.  The median age was 34 years. For every 100 females, there were 100.4 males.  For every 100 females age 18 and over, there were 98.3 males.

The median income for a household in the township was $64,515, and the median income for a family was $75,189. Males had a median income of $50,653 versus $35,882 for females. The per capita income for the township was $28,691.  About 1.7% of families and 3.1% of the population were below the poverty line, including 3.1% of those under age 18 and 3.5% of those age 65 or over.

Government

Local government
Effective January 1, 1972, the voters in the Township approved a change to a Mayor-Council form of government, governed by a directly elected mayor and a seven-member Township Council elected on an at-large basis. The mayor operates the government with the assistance of a Township Administrator, with the Council performing a legislative role. Starting from its inception in 1871, Mount Olive had been governed under the Township form of municipal government, by a three-person Township Committee, which was expanded to five members in 1968.

Mount Olive Township is governed under the Optional Municipal Charter Law's (Faulkner Act) Mayor-Council form of government (Plan E), enacted based on the recommendations of a Charter Study Commission. The governing body is comprised of the Mayor and the Township Council and provides for a "strong mayor", with a separately elected mayor and council. The township is one of 71 municipalities (of the 564) statewide that use this form of government. The governing body is comprised of the Mayor and the seven-member Township Council. The mayor, who is elected directly by the voters, is the Chief Executive Officer of the Township. The Mayor is responsible for carrying out all Council decisions and for the day-to-day operation of all functions of the municipality. The Township Council is comprised of seven members, who are elected on an at-large basis with staggered terms in elections held in odd-numbered years with either three seats or four seats coming up for vote; the mayor is up for election the same year that three council seats are up for vote. The Township Council is the legislative branch of the government and is responsible for approving the municipal budget and enacting ordinances. The council elects a Council President from among its members at an annual reorganization meeting. The Council President presides at all council meetings.

, the Mayor of Mount Olive Township is Republican Robert Greenbaum, whose term of office ends December 31, 2023. Members of the Township Council are Council President Joe Nicastro (R, 2023), Council Vice President Alex Roman (R, 2023), Daniel Amianda (R, 2025), John Ferrante (R, 2025), Colleen Labow (R, 2023), John Mania (R, 2025) and Gregory Stewart (R, 2025).

In July 2015, the Township Council selected Gregory Stewart from three candidates nominated by the Republican municipal committee to fill the seat expiring in December 2017 that had been held by Ray Perkins until his resignation from office to move out of the township, after having served 13 years in office; Stewart will serve on an interim basis until the November 2016 general election, when voters will choose a candidate to serve the one year remaining on the term of office.

Serving a term ending December 2013, Patrick Walsh resigned from office in February 2013, citing internal conflicts in the township's Republican Party government.

Federal, state and county representation
Mount Olive Township is located in the 7th Congressional District and is part of New Jersey's 24th state legislative district.

 

Morris County is governed by a Board of County Commissioners comprised of seven members who are elected at-large in partisan elections to three-year terms on a staggered basis, with either one or three seats up for election each year as part of the November general election. Actual day-to-day operation of departments is supervised by County Administrator, John Bonanni. , Morris County's Commissioners are
Commissioner Director Tayfun Selen (R, Chatham Township, term as commissioner ends December 31, 2023; term as director ends 2022),
Commissioner Deputy Director John Krickus (R, Washington Township, term as commissioner ends 2024; term as deputy director ends 2022),
Douglas Cabana (R, Boonton Township, 2022), 
Kathryn A. DeFillippo (R, Roxbury, 2022),
Thomas J. Mastrangelo (R, Montville, 2022),
Stephen H. Shaw (R, Mountain Lakes, 2024) and
Deborah Smith (R, Denville, 2024).
The county's constitutional officers are the County Clerk and County Surrogate (both elected for five-year terms of office) and the County Sheriff (elected for a three-year term). , they are 
County Clerk Ann F. Grossi (R, Parsippany–Troy Hills, 2023),
Sheriff James M. Gannon (R, Boonton Township, 2022) and
Surrogate Heather Darling (R, Roxbury, 2024).

Politics

As of March 23, 2011, there were a total of 15,159 registered voters in Mount Olive Township, of which 2,984 (19.7%) were registered as Democrats, 4,930 (32.5%) were registered as Republicans and 7,226 (47.7%) were registered as Unaffiliated. There were 19 voters registered as Libertarians or Greens.

In the 2012 presidential election, Republican Mitt Romney received 53.3% of the vote (5,664 cast), ahead of Democrat Barack Obama with 45.7% (4,855 votes), and other candidates with 1.1% (113 votes), among the 10,691 ballots cast by the township's 16,433 registered voters (59 ballots were spoiled), for a turnout of 65.1%. In the 2008 presidential election, Republican John McCain received 52.9% of the vote (6,191 cast), ahead of Democrat Barack Obama with 45.5% (5,327 votes) and other candidates with 1.1% (123 votes), among the 11,705 ballots cast by the township's 15,776 registered voters, for a turnout of 74.2%. In the 2004 presidential election, Republican George W. Bush received 59.0% of the vote (6,330 ballots cast), outpolling Democrat John Kerry with 39.9% (4,287 votes) and other candidates with 0.6% (91 votes), among the 10,731 ballots cast by the township's 14,794 registered voters, for a turnout percentage of 72.5.

In the 2013 gubernatorial election, Republican Chris Christie received 70.8% of the vote (4,315 cast), ahead of Democrat Barbara Buono with 27.1% (1,655 votes), and other candidates with 2.1% (126 votes), among the 6,158 ballots cast by the township's 16,376 registered voters (62 ballots were spoiled), for a turnout of 37.6%. In the 2009 gubernatorial election, Republican Chris Christie received 63.4% of the vote (4,663 ballots cast), ahead of Democrat Jon Corzine with 27.1% (1,995 votes), Independent Chris Daggett with 8.1% (596 votes) and other candidates with 0.7% (50 votes), among the 7,351 ballots cast by the township's 15,468 registered voters, yielding a 47.5% turnout.

Education
The Mount Olive Township School District serves public school students in kindergarten through twelfth grade. As of the 2018–19 school year, the district, comprised of six schools, had an enrollment of 4,643 students and 357.5 classroom teachers (on an FTE basis), for a student–teacher ratio of 13.0:1. Schools in the district (with 2018–19 enrollment data from the National Center for Education Statistics) are 
Mountain View Elementary School with 501 students in grades Pre-K–5, 
Sandshore Elementary School with 449 students in grades K–5, 
Chester M. Stephens Elementary School with 657 students in grades K–5, 
Tinc Road Elementary School with 459 students in grades K–5, 
Mount Olive Middle School with 1,064 students in grades 6–8 and 
Mount Olive High School with 1,503 students in grades 9–12.

Public library
The Mount Olive Public Library serves the informational, educational, cultural, and recreational resource of the township.  It is the objective of the Library to serve the community with programs, books and other media. The Mount Olive Township Library Association was incorporated in 1976. In 1979, a major addition was added to the original octagon.  In 1985, the township held a referendum with voters overwhelmingly in favor of municipalization. The Library officially became a municipal library in 1986.  In 1991, a second addition was added to include an administrative area and the periodical/reading room. In January 2005 the new library which was built on Flanders-Drakestown Road opened for residents.

Transportation

Roads and highways

The major roads that pass through include U.S. Route 46 through the center, U.S. Route 206 in the east and northeast part (called the "Netcong Bypass") and Interstate 80 (Bergen Passaic Expressway) in the north (which is also briefly multiplexed with US 206).

Public transportation
Commuter rail service is offered by NJ Transit at the Mount Olive station along its Morristown Line and Montclair-Boonton Line, offering service to Hoboken Terminal in Hoboken, New Jersey, Newark Broad Street Station, Secaucus Junction and Pennsylvania Station in Midtown Manhattan.

NJ Transit local bus service had been offered on the MCM5 route until 2010, when subsidies offered to the local service provider were eliminated as part of budget cuts.

Bus service is provided along Route 46 between Netcong and Dover on the Morris On the Move (M.O.M.) route.

Points of interest
The Seward Mansion was added to the National Register of Historic Places on December 24, 2013 for its significance in architecture.

The Mount Olive Village Historic District was added to the National Register of Historic Places on August 3, 2015. It includes the Mount Olive Baptist Church and Schoolhouse.

Vasa Park is a community of summer and retirement homes operated by District 6 of the Vasa Order of America, a Swedish cultural society. The park includes picnic and recreational facilities, a banquet hall, and a research library.

Pax Amicus Castle Theatre is a community theater on Budd Lake built in 1970 and designed to look like a medieval castle.

Notable people

People who were born in, residents of, or otherwise closely associated with Mount Olive Township include:

 Kenny Agostino (born 1992), ice hockey forward who played for the New Jersey Devils
 Noah Brown (born 1996), wide receiver who played college football at Ohio State
 Jonathan Nicholas (1757/59–1839), early settler of Flanders who served as a sergeant in the American Revolutionary War
 Keturah Orji (born 1996), track and field athlete specializing in the triple jump who was selected as part of the U.S. team at the 2016 Summer Olympics
 David W. K. Peacock Jr. (1924–2005), government official and businessman who served as a Deputy Undersecretary at the Department of Commerce during the Nixon Administration
 PES (born 1973 as Adam Pesapane), Oscar and Emmy-nominated director and stop-motion animator, whose short film Fresh Guacamole was nominated for the Academy Award for Best Animated Short Film in 2013
 Ryan Peterson (born 1995), professional footballer who plays for the Charlotte Independence in USL League One.
 Jen Ponton (born 1984), actress, screenwriter and producer, best known for portraying Rubi in the AMC series Dietland
 Lee Rouson (born 1962), former NFL running back for the New York Giants
 Daniel Elmer Salmon (1850–1914), veterinarian educated at Cornell University and graduated with the first Doctor of Veterinary Medicine degree in the United States
 Joshua S. Salmon (1846–1902), represented the 4th congressional district from March 4, 1899 – May 6, 1902
 Steve Slattery (born 1980), track and field athlete who is a steeplechase specialist

References

External links

Mount Olive Township website
Mount Olive Township School District
Mount Olive Public Library

School Data for the Mount Olive Township School District, National Center for Education Statistics
Local News

 
1871 establishments in New Jersey
Faulkner Act (mayor–council)
Populated places established in 1871
Townships in Morris County, New Jersey